Vincent O'Sullivan may refer to:

Vincent O'Sullivan (American writer) (1868–1940), American-born short story writer, poet and critic
Vincent O'Sullivan (New Zealand writer) (born 1937), New Zealand poet, short story writer, novelist, playwright, critic and editor
Vince O'Sullivan (born 1957), racewalker

See also
Vin Sullivan (1911–1999), American comic book editor, artist and publisher
Vinny Sullivan (born 1981), Irish footballer